Aminath Rishtha (born 30 May 1975) is a Maldivian sprinter. She competed in the women's 100 metres at the 1992 Summer Olympics. She was the first woman to represent the Maldives at the Olympics.

References

External links
 

1975 births
Living people
Athletes (track and field) at the 1992 Summer Olympics
Maldivian female sprinters
Olympic athletes of the Maldives
Place of birth missing (living people)
Olympic female sprinters